The 1979 UMass Minutemen football team represented the University of Massachusetts Amherst in the 1979 NCAA Division I-AA football season as a member of the Yankee Conference. The team was coached by Bob Pickett and played its home games at Alumni Stadium in Hadley, Massachusetts. The Minutemen came into the 1979 season on the heels of an appearance in the inaugural I-AA National Championship Game. Despite the high expectations, the team was still able to repeat as Yankee Conference Champions, though they did not earn a postseason berth. UMass finished the season with a record of 6–4 overall and 4–1 in conference play.

Schedule

References

UMass
UMass Minutemen football seasons
Yankee Conference football champion seasons
Umass Minutemen football